Mode 7 is a graphics mode on the Super Nintendo Entertainment System video game console that allows a background layer to be rotated and scaled on a scanline-by-scanline basis to create many different depth effects. The most famous of these effects is the application of a perspective effect on a background layer by scaling and rotating the background layer in this manner. This transforms the background layer into a two-dimensional horizontal texture-mapped plane that trades height for depth. Thus, an impression of three-dimensional graphics is achieved.

Mode 7 was one of Nintendo's prominent selling points for the Super NES platform in publications such as Nintendo Power and Super NES Player's Guide.  Similar faux 3D techniques have been presented on a few 2D systems other than the Super NES, in select peripherals and games.

Overview
The Super NES console has eight graphics modes, numbered from 0 to 7, for displaying background layers.  The last one (background mode 7) has a single layer that can be scaled and rotated. Two-dimensional affine transformations can produce any combination of translation, scaling, reflection, rotation, and shearing—and nothing else.

This graphical method is suited to racing games, and is used extensively for the overworld sections of role-playing games such as Square's popular 1994 game Final Fantasy VI. The effect enables developers to create the impression of sprawling worlds that continue toward the horizon.

A particular utilization technique with Mode 7 allows pixels of the background layer to be in front of sprites. Examples include the second and fifth stage of Contra III: The Alien Wars, the second and fifth stage of Jim Power: The Lost Dimension in 3-D, the introduction screen of Tiny Toon Adventures: Buster Busts Loose, when a player falls off the stage in Super Mario Kart, some cinematics in Super Metroid, and in some boss battles in Super Mario World.

Similar effects can be made on SNES without Mode 7, such as Axelay rolling pin vertical scrolling; and then it uses Mode 7 in one boss and in the end credits sequence.

Many Mode 7 games were remade for Game Boy Advance using effects reimplemented by other means.

The Sega Genesis has no hardware-native feature comparable to Mode 7. However, as in Tales of Phantasia and Star Oceans sprite effect add-ins, some comparable technical feats were programmed entirely in software, as in Dick Vitale's "Awesome, Baby!" College Hoops and Zero Tolerance. Similarly, such Amiga games include Mr. Nutz: Hoppin' Mad, Lionheart, Obitus, and Brian the Lion.

Selection of Mode 7 games

 7th Saga	
 The ActRaiser series
 Aero the Acro-Bat
 Ace o Nerae!
 Accele Brid
 Al Unser Jr.'s Road to the Top	
 Axelay
 Bastard!! The Brainies Brett Hull Hockey 95	
 Carrier Aces Contra III: The Alien Wars  Chrono Trigger	
 D-Force	
 Demon's Crest	
 DinoCity	
 Drakkhen 
 Exhaust Heat	
 F-Zero	
 Final Fantasy IV	
 Final Fantasy V	
 Final Fantasy VI	
 The Ganbare Goemon series
 HyperZone	
 Illusion of Gaia Jurassic Park Kat's Run: Zen-Nippon K Car Senshuken Kirby Super Star The Legend of Zelda: A Link to the Past Lock On	
 Lufia II: Rise of the Sinistrals The Magical Quest starring Mickey Mouse  MechWarrior Mega Man 7	
 Mohawk & Headphone Jack	
 Mr. Nutz  NCAA Basketball	
 NHL Stanley Cup	
 Power Rangers Zeo: Battle Racers Pilotwings	
 RoboCop 3 Romance of the Three Kingdoms IV: Wall of Fire Run Saber	
 R-Type III: The Third Lightning	
 Rendering Ranger: R2	
 Secret of Evermore	
 Secret of Mana and Trials of Mana Skyblazer	
 SOS Star Fox Star Ocean	
 Stargate Street Racer	
 Super Aleste Super Adventure Island  Super Castlevania IV	
 Super Copa Super Ghouls 'n Ghosts Super Mario Kart	
 Super Mario RPG: Legend of the Seven Stars	
 Super Mario World Super Mario World 2: Yoshi's Island Super Metroid	
 The Super Robot Wars series	
 Super Scope 6 The Super Star Wars series
 Super Tennis The Super Turrican series	
 Tales of Phantasia Teenage Mutant Ninja Turtles IV: Turtles in Time	
 Terranigma Wing Commander Wings 2 Aces High Wolfenstein 3D	
 Yoshi's Safari Zoku: The Legend of Bishin''

See also
Ray casting

References

Super Nintendo Entertainment System
Texture mapping
Video game development